Blackjack is a Swedish drama comedy film directed by Colin Nutley which was released to cinemas in Sweden on 7 October 1990.

Plot
The film is set in a dansband environment in Hedesunda and around Gävle during the Christmas and holiday season.

See also
 List of Christmas films

References

External links

1990 films
Films directed by Colin Nutley
Films set in Gästrikland
Swedish Christmas films
Swedish comedy-drama films
1990s Christmas comedy-drama films
1990s Swedish films